Konak is a village in Serbia. It is situated in the Sečanj municipality, Central Banat District, Vojvodina province. The population of the village numbering 996 people (2002 census), including 401 Serbs (40.26%), 371 Hungarians (37.24%), and others.

Name
In Serbian the village is known as Konak (Конак), in Hungarian as Kanak, in German as Konak, and in Romanian as Conac.

Historical population

1961: 1,726
1971: 1,459
1981: 1,211
1991: 1,150

School
The local elementary school is a converted mansion.

Gallery

See also
List of places in Serbia
List of cities, towns and villages in Vojvodina

References
Slobodan Ćurčić, Broj stanovnika Vojvodine, Novi Sad, 1996.

Populated places in Serbian Banat
Populated places in Central Banat District
Sečanj